James Brelsford (19 December 1855 – 24 December 1924) was an English cricketer who played for Derbyshire in 1883 and 1886.

Brelsford was born in Brimington, Derbyshire and became an iron moulder at Stanton by Dale. His Derbyshire debut came in the 1883 season, when Derbyshire played Lancashire. His opening game ended in an innings defeat, though Brelsford took one wicket during his bowling spell. Brelsford continued to play throughout the summer months of 1883, taking best bowling figures of 5-31 (matchend figures of 9-73) in his next game against Surrey. Brelsford played in three further County matches for Derbyshire during the 1883 season, and two matches against Marylebone Cricket Club. Taking 24 wickets in the season, Brelsford ended sharing  most wickets with William Cropper. Brelsford reappeared for the team one further time, during the 1886 season.

Brelsford was a right-arm medium-pace bowler and took 24 first-class wickets at an average of 20.08 and a best performance of 5-31. He was a right-handed batsman and played 14 innings in 8 first-class matches with an average of 4.30 and a top score of 16.

Brelsford moved to Bowdon, Cheshire, where he was a long-standing member of Bowdon Cricket Club. He died in Bowdon aged 69.

References

External links
James Brelsford at Cricket Archive

People from Brimington
Cricketers from Derbyshire
1855 births
1924 deaths
English cricketers
Derbyshire cricketers